John Vallone (June 23, 1953 – March 15, 2004) was an American production designer and art director. He was nominated for an Academy Award in the category Best Art Direction for the film Star Trek: The Motion Picture.

Selected filmography
 Star Trek: The Motion Picture (1979)

References

External links

1953 births
2004 deaths
American production designers
American art directors
Artists from Pennsylvania
Deaths by drowning in the United States